Rosalind Morag Ellis KC was appointed to the position Dean of Arches from 8 June 2020. She is therefore the senior ecclesiastical judge of the Church of England.

Ellis was called to the bar at by Gray’s Inn in 1984 and has been Queen's Counsel since 2006.

Her practice is based at the Francis Taylor Building in the Inner Temple.

References

British women judges
English King's Counsel
Living people
21st-century English judges
Year of birth missing (living people)